The Old Court House, is a judicial building in St Peter's Square in Ruthin, Denbighshire, North Wales. It is a Grade II* listed building.

History

The current building was built to replace an earlier structure, owned by the de Grey family, was notable for being the first building to be attacked at the outset of Owain Glyndŵr's revolt on 6 September 1400. The new building was completed in 1421 and served as the courthouse until 1663 when the town hall was built on the square.

The building was the local administrative centre, court, and gaol. Visible within are fine old roof timbers, and on the north-west outside corner is the stump of a gallows beam. The courthouse and cells remained in use until 1785 when the new shire hall was built in Record Street. Ruthin could claim to be a county town under the Acts of Union passed during the reign of Henry VIII, with the appropriate meetings of the Court Quarter Sessions and the Great Sessions (or assizes) being held in the town.

The old court house was also in commercial use during the 18th century: in 1741 a petition was raised by butchers of the town and given to the owner Richard Myddleton complaining their meat was exposed to all elements of weather. This resulted in the building of “the shambles” a lean-to on the north face of the building (Welsh: Pendist) a two-storey construction, photos show three dormer windows set into the roof. The butchers earned extra income by offering grandstand seating on the roof for views of the bear-baiting which took place on the Square. In the 19th century it served as a grocery: "Aldrich's Grocery and Hardware Stores". Then, in 1926 it was converted into a branch of the National Westminster Bank to the design of Frank Shayler and served in that role until its closure in 2017.

See also
Siop Nain
Ruthin Town Hall

References

Buildings and structures completed in 1401
Grade II* listed buildings in Denbighshire
Ruthin